Chapsa is a genus of lichens in the family Graphidaceae. The genus was described by Italian lichenologist Abramo Bartolommeo Massalongo in 1860.

Species

Chapsa albida 
Chapsa alborosella 
Chapsa alletii 
Chapsa angustispora 
Chapsa boninensis 
Chapsa chionostoma 
Chapsa cinchonarum 
Chapsa diploschistoides 
Chapsa discoides 
Chapsa dissuta 
Chapsa eitenii 
Chapsa elabens 
Chapsa farinosa 
Chapsa francisci 
Chapsa granulifera 
Chapsa halei         
Chapsa hiata 
Chapsa hypoconstictica 
Chapsa imperfecta 
Chapsa indica 
Chapsa inspersa  – Brazil
Chapsa isidiata 
Chapsa laemensis 
Chapsa leprocarpa 
Chapsa meghalayensis 
Chapsa microspora 
Chapsa multicarpa 
Chapsa neei 
Chapsa niveocarpa 
Chapsa nubila 
Chapsa pallidella 
Chapsa paralbida 
Chapsa patens 
Chapsa perdissuta 
Chapsa pulchella 
Chapsa pulchra 
Chapsa referta 
Chapsa rubropruinosa 
Chapsa rubropulveracea 
Chapsa scabiocarpa 
Chapsa scabiomarginata 
Chapsa sorediata 
Chapsa sublilacina 
Chapsa thallotrema 
Chapsa thambapanni  – Sri Lanka
Chapsa tibellii 
Chapsa wijeyaratniana

References

Ostropales
Lichen genera
Ostropales genera
Taxa described in 1860
Taxa named by Abramo Bartolommeo Massalongo